Casey Hudson is a Canadian video game developer, known for his work on several of BioWare's video games, and mainly the Mass Effect trilogy as game director.

Biography
After obtaining a degree in mechanical engineering, Hudson began his career at the Canadian video game developer BioWare with credits as a technical artist on several games, including MDK 2. He eventually became the project director of Star Wars: Knights of the Old Republic. Hudson fulfilled the same role in the development of the Mass Effect trilogy, a series of games based on a new science fiction intellectual property.

On August 7, 2014, Hudson left BioWare to pursue other projects. On May 18, 2015, Microsoft announced that Hudson had joined their video game production wing at Microsoft Studios as creative director. On July 18, 2017, Hudson announced that he had returned to BioWare and replaced Aaryn Flynn as general manager for the studio.

Hudson announced he was departing BioWare a second time on December 3, 2020.

In June 2021, Hudson announced that he has established a new game development studio, Humanoid Studios, that is currently working on a new IP.

Games
MDK 2 (2000)
Baldur's Gate II: Shadows of Amn (2000)
Neverwinter Nights (2002)
Star Wars: Knights of the Old Republic (2003)
Jade Empire (2005)
Mass Effect (2007)
Mass Effect 2 (2010)
Mass Effect 3 (2012)
Anthem (2019)

References

Canadian video game designers
Star Wars: Knights of the Old Republic developers
Year of birth missing (living people)
Living people
Place of birth missing (living people)
Microsoft employees
BioWare people